The Darley Oak is a Pedunculate oak tree (Quercus robur) which grows near Darleyford in the parish of Linkinhorne on the edge of Bodmin Moor, Cornwall, England, UK. This ancient tree is thought to be at least 1,000 years old, and a considerable number of legends take it as their core. Folk tradition attributes healing properties to the tree, and it is said that any wish made to it will eventually come true. Its acorns are also used as amulets, and were once used by pregnant women during pregnancy, to bring them luck. It was chosen one of the 50 Great British Trees by The Tree Council in 2002.

See also

List of Great British Trees
List of individual trees

References

Individual oak trees
Individual trees in England
Bodmin Moor
Environment of Cornwall